Simon Kessler (born 14 March 1975) is a South African former professional racing cyclist. He won the South African National Road Race Championships in 1998 and 2000.

Major results
1998
 National Road Championships
1st  Road race
2nd Time trial
1999
 2nd Time trial, National Road Championships
2000
 National Road Championships
1st  Road race
3rd Time trial
2001
 1st  Time trial, African Road Championships
 2nd Road race, National Road Championships
2003
 Giro del Capo
1st Points classification
1st Stage 2

References

External links
 

1975 births
Living people
South African male cyclists
Cyclists from Johannesburg
White South African people